Generation III reactors, or Gen III reactors, are a class of nuclear reactors designed to succeed Generation II reactors, incorporating evolutionary improvements in design. These include improved fuel technology, higher thermal efficiency, significantly enhanced safety systems (including passive nuclear safety), and standardized designs intended to reduce maintenance and capital costs. They are promoted by the Generation IV International Forum (GIF).

The first Generation III reactors to begin operation were Kashiwazaki 6 and 7 advanced boiling water reactors (ABWRs) in 1996 and 1997. Since 2012, both have been shut down due to security concerns. Due to the prolonged period of stagnation in the construction of new reactors and the continued (albeit declining) popularity of Generation II/II+ designs in new construction, relatively few third generation reactors have been built.

Overview
The older Gen II reactors comprise the vast majority of current nuclear reactors. Gen III reactors are so-called advanced light-water reactors (LWRs). Gen III+ reactors are labeled as "evolutionary designs". Though the distinction between Gen II and III reactors is arbitrary, few Gen III reactors have reached the commercial stage as of 2022. The Generation IV International Forum calls Gen IV reactors "revolutionary designs". These are concepts for which no concrete prognoses for realization existed at the time.

The improvements in reactor technology in third generation reactors are intended to result in a longer operational life (designed for 60 years of operation, extendable to 100+ years of operation prior to complete overhaul and reactor pressure vessel replacement) compared with currently used Generation II reactors (designed for 40 years of operation, extendable to 60+ years of operation prior to complete overhaul and pressure vessel replacement).

The core damage frequencies for these reactors are designed to be lower than for Generation II reactors – 60 core damage events for the European Pressurized Reactor (EPR) and 3 core damage events for the Economic Simplified Boiling Water Reactor (ESBWR) per 100 million reactor-years are significantly lower than the 1,000 core damage events per 100 million reactor-years for BWR/4 Generation II reactors.

The third generation EPR reactor was also designed to use uranium more efficiently than older Generation II reactors, using approximately 17% less per unit of electricity generated than these older reactor technologies. An independent analysis conducted by environmental scientist Barry Brook on the greater efficiency and therefore lower material needs of Gen III reactors, corroborates this finding.

Developments 

Gen III+ reactor designs are an evolutionary development of Gen III reactors, offering improvements in safety over Gen III reactor designs. Manufacturers began development of Gen III+ systems in the 1990s by building on the operating experience of the American, Japanese, and Western European light-water reactor.

The nuclear industry began to promote a nuclear renaissance suggesting that Gen III+ designs should solve three key problems: safety, cost and buildability. Construction costs of US$1,000/kW were forecast, a level that would make nuclear competitive with gas, and construction times of four years or less were expected. However, these estimates proved over-optimistic.

A notable improvement of Gen III+ systems over second-generation designs is the incorporation in some designs of passive safety features that do not require active controls or operator intervention but instead rely on gravity or natural convection to mitigate the impact of abnormal events.

Generation III+ reactors incorporate extra safety features to avoid the kind of disaster suffered at Fukushima in 2011. Generation III+ designs, passive safety, also known as passive cooling, requires no sustained operator action or electronic feedback to shut down the plant safely in the event of an emergency. Many of the Generation III+ nuclear reactors have a core catcher. If the fuel cladding and reactor vessel systems and associated piping become molten, corium will fall into a core catcher which holds the molten material and has the ability to cool it. This, in turn protects the final barrier, the containment building. As an example, Rosatom installed a 200-tonne core catcher in the VVER reactor as the first large piece of equipment in the reactor building of Rooppur 1, describing it as "a unique protection system". In 2017, Rosatom has started commercial operations of the NVNPP-2 Unit 1 VVER-1200 reactor in central Russia, marking the world's first full start-up of a generation III+ reactor.

First reactors

The first Generation III reactors were built in Japan, in the form of advanced boiling water reactors. On 5 August 2016, a Generation III+ VVER-1200/392M reactor became operational (first grid connection) at Novovoronezh Nuclear Power Plant II in Russia, which was the first operational Generation III+ reactor. 

Several other Generation III+ reactors are under late-stage construction in Europe, China, India, and the United States. The next Generation III+ reactors to come online were an AREVA EPR reactor at the Taishan Nuclear Power Station (first grid connection on 2018-06-29) and a Westinghouse AP1000 reactor at the Sanmen Nuclear Power Station (first grid connection on 2018-06-30) in China.

In the United States, reactor designs are certified by the Nuclear Regulatory Commission (NRC). , the commission has approved seven new designs, and is considering one design more as well as renewal of an expired certification.

Response and criticism 
Proponents of nuclear power and some who have historically been critical have acknowledged that third generation reactors as a whole are safer than older reactors.

Edwin Lyman, a senior staff scientist at the Union of Concerned Scientists, has challenged specific cost-saving design choices made for two Generation III reactors, both the AP1000 and ESBWR. Lyman, John Ma (a senior structural engineer at the NRC), and Arnold Gundersen (an anti-nuclear consultant) are concerned about what they perceive as weaknesses in the steel containment vessel and the concrete shield building around the AP1000 in that its containment vessel does not have sufficient safety margins in the event of a direct airplane strike. Other engineers do not agree with these concerns, and claim the containment building is more than sufficient in safety margins and factors of safety.

The Union of Concerned Scientists in 2008 referred to the EPR as the only new reactor design under consideration in the United States that "...appears to have the potential to be significantly safer and more secure against attack than today's reactors."

There have also been issues in fabricating the precision parts necessary to maintain safe operation of these reactors, with cost overruns, broken parts, and extremely fine steel tolerances causing issues with new reactors under construction in France at the Flamanville Nuclear Power Plant.

Lists of Generation III reactors

Generation III reactors currently operational or under construction

Generation III designs not adopted or built yet

Lists of Generation III+ reactors

Generation III+ reactors currently operational or under construction

Generation III+ designs not adopted or built yet

See also

 Generation II reactor
 Generation IV reactor
 List of reactor types

References

External links
 Nuclear Reactors Knowledge Base, IAEA
 Advanced Nuclear Power Reactors , World Nuclear Association, May 2008

Nuclear power reactor types